Enos is a short-lived American action-comedy television series and a spin-off of The Dukes of Hazzard. It originally aired on CBS from November 12, 1980, to May 20, 1981. The series focused on the adventures of Enos Strate, a former deputy in rural Hazzard County, after he moved to Los Angeles to join the LAPD. Actor Sonny Shroyer played the character of Enos on both shows. The scene was set for Enos leaving Hazzard to become a Los Angeles lawman in the third season Dukes of Hazzard episode "Enos Strate To The Top".

Each episode of "Enos" featured the title character fighting crime alongside partner Turk Adams. Episodes usually began and ended with Enos writing a letter to "Dukes of Hazzard" character Daisy Duke in which he told her of his adventures in L.A. In an attempt to boost ratings, a number of characters from The Dukes of Hazzard (Daisy, Uncle Jesse and Rosco) were brought in as guest stars, but "Enos" still failed to catch on. It was canceled after one 18-episode season.

The character Enos Strate returned to The Dukes of Hazzard beginning in autumn 1982, at the start of the show's fifth season. It had been written into Shroyer's contract that he be allowed to return to the series if Enos was cancelled. In the CBS film specials made years after the series ended -- The Dukes of Hazzard: Reunion! (1997) and The Dukes of Hazzard: Hazzard in Hollywood (2000) -- Enos appeared as a California lawman. It was explained that he had returned to the LAPD and eventually become a detective.

Cast

Episodes

External links
 

The Dukes of Hazzard
CBS original programming
1980s American comedy-drama television series
1980 American television series debuts
1981 American television series endings
American action television series
American television spin-offs
English-language television shows
Television series by Warner Bros. Television Studios
Television shows set in Los Angeles
Fictional portrayals of the Los Angeles Police Department
American action comedy television series